Leh Lub Salub Rarng is a 2017 Thai romantic comedy television series starring Nadech Kugimiya, Urassaya Sperbund , Preechaya Pongthananikorn and Thanapob Leeratanakajorn. It aired on Channel 3 from July 31 to September 4, 2017.

Synopsis 
Ramin, a high-profile police officer from a special unit, he is an egocentric playboy who looks down on women; and Petra, an arrogant and ungrateful superstar who looks down on men and her co-workers. Sinfulness bring these two together to learn integrity, honesty and respect by swapping bodies. They face danger, difficulties and obstacles to gradually improve, share, care and find true love on this incredible journey.

Cast

Main cast 
 Nadech Kugimiya as Ramin
 Urassaya Sperbund as Petra Pawadee
 Thanapob Leeratanakajorn as Akom
 Preechaya Pongthananikorn Nokyoong

Supporting cast 

 Premmanat Suwannanon as Ridtichad Adisorn (Old name) / Richard Adisorn (Rid) (New name) 
 Ji Yeon Seo as Ji Ein (Nokyoong Friend) 
 Krerk Chiller as Sak (Constellation fortune teller)
 Wichai Jongpasitkhun as Da-noo (Executive of IMAGE of LIFE Company)
 Daraneenuch Pohpiti as Tommanee (Tom) / Dr.Tibmanee
 Thanatchapan Booranachewaailai as Jae Aum (Petra's Manager) 
 Thitinun Suwansuk as Phan Tamruat Ek Yudtapong Ead-in (Sa Ra Wad Yudtapong) 
 Rachanee Siralert as Kun Nai Poungkram Adisorn (Ridtichad Mother)  
 Kampoo Padtamasood as Kun Nai Jitta (Nokyoong Mother) 
 Wiragarn Seneetunti as Assara Borisud (As) (TV series villain) 
 Nithichai YotAmornSunthorn as Artid Ridtirong (tid) (TV series hero)
 Tor Ruengrit Wisamol as Song (Henchman Richard)
 Thodsapol Siriwiwat as Drama Director  
 Oak Keerati as Director Kong

Cameo appearance 
 San Eittisukkhanan as MC of Special Night Show (Ep.1)
 Sumonthip Leungutai as Seetala Wantib (Journalist) (Ep.1) 
 Natchanon Puvanont as Roi Tamruat Tri Han (Ep.1,3,5,6,7,8,9,10) 
 Chatwat Rattanawong as Roi Tamruat Tri Jack (Ep.1,3,5,6,7,8,9,10) 
 as Roi Tamruat Tri Tong (Ep.1,3,5,6,7,8,9,10) 
 as Roi Tamruat Tri Jo’ (Ep.1,3,5,6,7,8,9,10)
 Dan Chupong as Stunt performer (Ep.1)
 Jakkrid Kanokpodjananon as Stunt performer (Ep.1)

Performer  
 Pongsit Phisitthakan as Journalist (Ep.1)
 Siwakorn Wirotdulay as Phon Tamruat Ek (Ep.1,8,9) 
 Bencha Singkharawat as Guest at the GOLD LION MOVIE AWARDS (Ep.1) 
 Nawaporn Supingklad as Special Night Show team (Ep.1) 
 Pimpawan Chokbawornmethawat as Special Night Show team (Ep.1) / Nursing (Ep.4) 
 Thidaporn Mojai as Meow (STAR HOLLY WOOD company employee) (Ep.1,2,3,6,7)
 Kittipol Ketmanee as The hostage when the culprit was captured and tied the giant firecrackers to him. (Ep.3)
 Wiwat Rattanapitak as Royal Thai Police (Ep.3) 
 Somjat Thongpreche as Royal Thai Police (Ep.3) 
 Chitrakorn Pinprachaporn as Guest in the fashion show Ying Nam Phet Nam Nueng (Ep.3,4)
 Siranee Yankittikarn as Guest in the fashion show Ying Nam Phet Nam Nueng (Ep.3,4)
 Charin Kornkanha as Guest in the fashion show Ying Nam Phet Nam Nueng (Ep.3,4)
 Ra-cha-ta Singchan as Guest in the fashion show Ying Nam Phet Nam Nueng (Ep.3,4) 
 Wanthanee Chana-Chai-Yang-Young as Guest in the fashion show Ying Nam Phet Nam Nueng (Ep.3,4)
 Khomkri Wongvirot as Diamond robber at the fashion show of Lady Nam Phet Nam Nueng (Ep.3,4)
 Mongkol Wongthiphayawut as Doctor (Ep.4)
 Jakkawan Jamradsee as Royal Thai Police (Ep.4)
 Honey Saeng Saeng as Honey (Condo public relations staff) (Ep.4)
 Bank Tongtung as An ancient warrior who fought with Ramil in the past. (Ep.4) 
 Nainan Tantulkanokrat as Da-Noo Secretary (Ep.5,7)
 Chat Luan-Kiao as The reporter interviewed Da-Noo (Ep.5,9,10)
 Thanyarak Somboon as Public Relations Officer, STAR HOLLY WOOD Company (Ep.6)
 Sirivej Charoenchon as Royal Thai Police (Ep.6)
 Waipod Krouysawad as Royal Thai Police (Ep.6)
 Panata Sukjit as Henchman Richard (Ep.7)
 Chonchana Saichanhom as Henchman Richard (Ep.7)
 Natakorn Ruengsee as Henchman Richard (Ep.8,9)
 Veerayut Paoliengthong as (Henchman Richard) (Ep.8)
 Jeerapad Sawangjang as Security company STAR HOLLY WOOD (Ep.8) 
 Chinthan Thienkittipong as Wedding guests, Lt. Ramil and Peacock at the hotel (Ep.8) 
 Sethanich Amornaya-Suthisiri as Wedding guests, Lt. Ramil and Peacock at the hotel (Ep.8) 
 Virawut Kemkhang as Henchman Richard (Ep.9)
 Darunphop Suriyawong as Henchman Richard (Ep.9) 
 Art Lamnarai as Henchman Richard (Ep.9) 
 Pattanaset Chiratharn as Wedding guest, Pol. Lt. Arkom (Kom) and Mayura (Peacock) (Ep.10)
 Vita Deeplangploy as Wedding guest, Pol. Lt. Arkom (Kom) and Mayura (Peacock) (Ep.10) 
 Kornpong Kitnitipramoun as Wedding guest, Pol. Lt. Arkom (Kom) and Mayura (Peacock) (Ep.10) 
 Peeradet Ruengsamran as Journalist (Ep.10)

International broadcast
 In the Philippines, the series was aired on GMA Network from October 10 to November 22, 2018, under the title Switch. It was the third Lakorn (Thai drama) aired in Philippine television.
 In Malaysia, the series was aired on TV3 in 2020.

Awards and nominations

References

External links 
  

Thai television soap operas
2017 Thai television series debuts
2017 Thai television series endings
Thai romantic comedy television series
Thai action television series
Channel 3 (Thailand) original programming